Lobelia monostachya, the one-stalked lobelia, is a species of flowering plant in the family Campanulaceae that is endemic to  the island of Oahu in Hawaii. It was previously believed to be extinct. In 1994 it was rediscovered and only 8 individuals are currently known to exist. Associated native plants include Artemisia australis, Carex meyenii, Eragrostis spp., and Psilotum nudum. It is threatened by habitat loss.

References

External links

monostachya
Endemic flora of Hawaii
Biota of Oahu
Plants described in 1988
Taxonomy articles created by Polbot